Maurizio Biondo (born 15 May 1981) is an Italian former professional cyclist.

Major results

2001
 1st Prologue (TTT) Girobio
 3rd Time trial, Mediterranean Games
2002
 3rd Overall Tour de Berlin
1st Stage 3
2003
 2nd Time trial, National Under-23 Road Championships
 2nd Roue Tourangelle
 2nd Grand Prix de Waregem
 7th Overall Le Triptyque des Monts et Châteaux
 7th La Côte Picarde
 10th Poreč Trophy
2005
 1st Trofeo Zsšdi
 4th Trofeo Franco Balestra
 9th Giro del Belvedere
 10th Ruota d'Oro
2006
 1st Trofeo Edil C
 2nd Coppa della Pace
 6th Overall Giro del Friuli Venezia Giulia
 6th 
 6th GP Industrie del Marmo
 8th Circuito Belvedere
2007
 1st Overall Vuelta a Navarra
1st Points classification
1st Stage 1
 2nd Clásica Memorial Txuma
 8th Overall Flèche du Sud
 8th Overall Istrian Spring Trophy
2008
 1st Overall Volta ao Distrito de Santarém
1st Stage 3
 3rd Time trial, National Road Championships
 3rd Gran Premio Città di Camaiore
2009
 1st Ronde van Drenthe
 2nd Overall Danmark Rundt
1st Stage 5
 3rd Time trial, National Road Championships
 9th Tre Valli Varesine
 10th Giro del Veneto
 10th Gran Premio Industria e Commercio Artigianato Carnaghese

References

External links

1981 births
Living people
Italian male cyclists
Mediterranean Games bronze medalists for Italy
Mediterranean Games medalists in cycling
Competitors at the 2001 Mediterranean Games
Cyclists from the Province of Monza e Brianza
20th-century Italian people
21st-century Italian people